Brook Antoinette Mahealani Lee (born January 8, 1971) is an American former beauty queen who was crowned Miss Hawaii USA 1997, Miss USA 1997, and Miss Universe 1997. Lee is the first native Hawaiian to win the title of Miss Universe.

Early life
Lee was born on January 8, 1971, in Pearl City, Hawaii. She is of Chinese, Korean, Native Hawaiian, Portuguese, French, Dutch and English ancestry. Her Korean grandfather emigrated to Hawaii in the 1950s. Lee's mother, Toni, was president of Na Pua Ke Ali'i Pauahi, an alumni association of the school who petitioned the board for reforms. 

Lee attended University Lab School for one year (1987–88) and graduated from Kamehameha Schools in 1989. She is a graduate of Chaminade University. Lee also pursued graduate-level studies in communications at the University of Hawaii at Manoa. 

Her Korean name is Lee Shi-nae (이시내).

Pageantry

Miss USA 1997
Lee was crowned Miss Hawaii USA on her first try, then went on to participate in Miss USA 1997 at Shreveport, Louisiana on February 5, 1997, where she was crowned the winner by outgoing titleholder Ali Landry of Louisiana.

Miss Universe 1997
Lee represented the United States in the Miss Universe 1997 pageant in Miami Beach, Florida. On May 16, 1997, she won the crown at 26 years and 128 days, becoming the oldest Miss Universe to win up until the victory of Andrea Meza, Miss Universe 2020, who won at the age of 26 years and 276 days. This record would be broken once more during the Miss Universe 2022 competition when R'Bonney Gabriel won at the age of 28 years and 300 days.

Lee and Al Masini, along with funding from the state, helped bring the Miss Universe 1998 pageant to Honolulu, Hawaii, for the first time.

Later life
After her reign as Miss Universe she made several cameo appearances in movies and television shows, and has hosted many television shows in Asia and the United States. She is the host of a regional television show known as Pacific Fusion, which focuses on Asian-American lifestyles. She has also hosted episodes of Great Cruises on the Travel Channel.

References

External links

Brook Lee - Official Website

Honolulu Star-Bulletin article from 2004 

1971 births
American actresses of Chinese descent
American actresses of Korean descent
American beauty pageant winners
American people of Dutch descent
American people of English descent
American people of French descent
American people of Native Hawaiian descent
American people of Portuguese descent
Kamehameha Schools alumni
Living people
Miss Universe 1997 contestants
Miss Universe winners
Miss USA 1997 delegates
Miss USA winners

University of Hawaiʻi at Mānoa alumni

Hawaii people of Chinese descent
20th-century American people
People from Pearl City, Hawaii
21st-century American women